Isopsestis is a genus of moths belonging to the subfamily Thyatirinae. The genus was described by Werny in 1968.

Species
 Isopsestis cuprina (Moore, 1881)
 Isopsestis meyi Laszlo, G. Ronkay, L. Ronkay & Witt, 2007
 Isopsestis moorei Laszlo, G. Ronkay, L. Ronkay & Witt, 2007
 Isopsestis naumanni Laszlo, G. Ronkay, L. Ronkay & Witt, 2007

References

 Werny, K. (1968). Ergebnisse der Forschungs-Unternehmens Nepal Himalaya 3: 13.
 

Thyatirinae
Drepanidae genera